This is a list of the largest cities in Asia ranked according to population within their city limits. It deals exclusively with the areas within city administrative boundaries (municipalities) as opposed to urban areas or metropolitan areas, which are generally larger in terms of population than the main city.

The list includes cities geographically situated in Asia, using the conventional definition of its boundaries.

Please note that the compiled figures are not collected at the same time in every country, or at the same level of accuracy, therefore the ranking of the cities according to their population can be misleading.

List

See also
List of metropolitan areas in Asia

Notes

References

Population within city limits